Vicki Ann Lawrence ( Axelrad; born March 26, 1949), sometimes credited as Vicki Lawrence Schultz, is an American actress, comedian, and singer. She is best known for her character Mama (Thelma Harper). Lawrence originated multitudes of characters beyond Mama on CBS's The Carol Burnett Show from 1967 to 1978, the variety show's entire series run.

In The Carol Burnett Shows 7th season, Lawrence debuted her famed Mama role on a comedy sketch called The Family. Only created as a one-off skit, The Familys unexpected success   with audiences led to it having recurring installments for the final 5 seasons of the program. With Lawrence portraying the character of a cold, unaffectionate, widowed elderly mother to the neurotic, misfortunate Eunice (played by Burnett despite Lawrence being 16 years younger), The Family bred some of The Carol Burnett Shows most famed blooper moments.

The success of The Family skits eventually spun off into Lawrence landing her own television sitcom, Mama's Family, her character becoming the focal point and Mama's traits expanding and evolving dramatically. Continuing Mama's evolution, Lawrence has hosted an untelevised stand-up comedy routine since 2001, "Vicki and Mama: A Two Woman Show." Moreover, Lawrence has made numerous post-Mama's Family guest TV show appearances in her famed Mama role.

In 1973, Lawrence became a one-hit wonder songstress, landing on the U.S. chart with "The Night the Lights Went Out in Georgia". It reached number one on both the United States and Canada charts. She also released an album on Bell Records. Lawrence has multiple Emmy Award nominations, winning one in 1976. She is also a multiple Golden Globe nominee, all for The Carol Burnett Show. She also made several guest appearances in the Disney Channel sitcom Hannah Montana. Most recently, Lawrence starred in the Fox sitcom series The Cool Kids from 2018 to 2019.

Early life 
Lawrence was born Vicki Ann Axelrad in Inglewood, California, the daughter of Anne Alene (née Loyd) and Howard Axelrad, a certified public accountant for Max Factor. The family surname was legally changed to "Lawrence" when Vicki was young. She is a graduate of Morningside High School in Inglewood, class of 1967. Lawrence had originally planned on being a dental hygienist. She attended UCLA while on The Carol Burnett Show, and  changed her major to theater arts, but dropped out after two years.

In high school, she auditioned for and got into the musical group The Young Americans. She stayed with the group almost until the end of high school. By being with the group, she gained experience from touring, performing at the Oscars, coming in contact with noteworthy performers such as Johnny Mathis and Louis Armstrong, and performing on The Andy Williams Show.

In her senior year, she entered the Miss Fireball of Inglewood contest for the local firefighter's ball. A reporter for a local newspaper wrote a story about the contest and stated that Lawrence bore a striking resemblance to a young Carol Burnett. An avid fan letter-writer, Lawrence's mother urged her to write a letter, which Lawrence did, including the newspaper article.

After receiving the letter, Burnett found Lawrence's father's name in the phone book, called him, and said she would go to see the Miss Fireball contest. Lawrence won the contest and Burnett was called to the stage to crown her. Coincidentally, Burnett was looking for an actress to play her younger sister on her upcoming show. After a few months and auditions, Lawrence got the part at age eighteen, specifically for playing Chrissy in the "Carol and Sis" sketches.

After Lawrence was given the job on The Carol Burnett Show, both Burnett and Harvey Korman took her under their wings. Korman taught her various sketch comedy skills, such as listening not just for a cue line, and also coached her in other areas, such as speaking in different accents. Lawrence has credited Korman and Burnett with being her mentors, and has referred to her experience on the show as the "Harvard school of comedy". Lawrence has stated that she learned show business from Burnett and looked up to her very much, and that the two share a very close friendship.

Career

Acting 

As a comedian and actress, Lawrence is best known for her work on The Carol Burnett Show, of which she was a part from 1967 to 1978. She was the only cast member, except for Burnett herself, who stayed on the show for the entire 11 seasons. After The Carol Burnett Show ended in 1978, Lawrence and her husband Al Schultz moved with their children to Maui, Hawaii, but after a few years, returned to Los Angeles, where they have remained.

Her portrayal of the Mama character on The Carol Burnett Show's "The Family" sketches was so popular that NBC subsequently created the sitcom Mama's Family, elaborating on the Mama character. (Burnett reprised the Eunice Higgins character for the sitcom from time to time.) The series ran from 1983 to 1985 on NBC; after its cancellation from NBC, it was renewed from 1986 to 1990 in first-run syndication. The show was more successful in the renewed version. She also reprised the Mama character on stage for Vicki Lawrence & Mama: A Two-Woman Show.

Lawrence has made appearances on other programs, such as the sitcoms Laverne & Shirley, Major Dad, Roseanne, Hannah Montana, and Yes, Dear. She appeared in two episodes of Murder, She Wrote, playing different characters. Between the NBC and syndication runs of Mama's Family, Lawrence starred in the 1985 comedy pilot Anything for Love, which aired as a special on CBS that summer and co-starred Lauren Tewes and Rebeca Arthur. Lawrence has also appeared with Burnett, Korman, and Tim Conway in the Burnett show retrospectives that were broadcast in 1993, 2001, and 2004. Lawrence played Sister Mary Paul (Sister Amnesia) in the TV special based on Nunsense Jamboree that originally aired on TNN in 1998.

Lawrence played Mamaw Stewart (the mother of Robby Ray Stewart and grandmother of Jackson and Miley Stewart) in the hit Disney series Hannah Montana alongside Billy Ray Cyrus and his daughter Miley Cyrus.

Lawrence played as Mama in an Ohio commercial, promoting a constitutional amendment that would permit casino gambling in Ohio. Lawrence played Dan's old high-school flame, Phyllis, in an episode of Roseanne. She also appeared in a special celebrity-edition episode of the Anne Robinson version of The Weakest Link. Playing for a charity, she made it to the final two but ended up losing to Ed Begley, Jr.

Music 
As a singer, Lawrence got her start as one of the scores of hopefuls on the syndicated Johnny Mann's Stand Up And Cheer program. However, she is most known for her number-one hit, "The Night the Lights Went Out in Georgia", a song written by her first husband Bobby Russell, which was released on Bell Records in November 1972. It sold over two million copies and was awarded a gold disc by the Recording Industry Association of America in April 1973. During the last episode of the sixth season of The Carol Burnett Show (March 24, 1973), Lawrence received her gold record by surprise from Carol Burnett. Her first LP, The Night the Lights Went Out in Georgia, was issued soon after the single went gold. The song was re-recorded by Reba McEntire for her 1991 album For My Broken Heart. McEntire released the track as a single to country radio in 1992 and it peaked at No. 12 on the country chart, aided in part by a highly cinematic music video.

"He Did With Me", Lawrence's follow-up to "The Night the Lights Went Out in Georgia", reached number 75 in the United States, although it reached the top 20 of the adult contemporary music charts and also became her biggest hit in Australia, peaking at number one there in November 1973. She followed it up there with "Ships in the Night" (1974). In the fall of 1975, Lawrence managed one last minor U.S. chart entry on the Private Stock label with "The Other Woman" (number 81).

In 1974, she recorded her second LP for Bell Records, Ships in the Night. The label was in the process of being phased out by Arista, and the LP was not released in the U.S. The LP was, however, released in Australia, where she continued to have chart success. Lawrence's first two LPs were released as a single CD with bonus tracks on April 1, 2014, by Real Gone Music.

She released a disco album entitled Newborn Woman late 1979. The album produced the minor disco hit "Don't Stop the Music".

Hosting and other work 
As an emcee, she hosted the daytime NBC version of the game show Win, Lose or Draw (1987-90), as well as an unsold pilot for Mark Goodson Productions, 1990's Body Talk, and has also appeared often as a popular celebrity player on such game shows as Match Game, Password, Password Plus, Super Password, and various incarnations of the Pyramid game show, where she was known for verbally sparring with host Dick Clark on numerous occasions. In one episode, she also left after losing only to return during the closing credits. She also appeared on the 1986–89 version of Hollywood Squares, where she appeared both as herself and in character as Thelma "Mama" Harper. Lawrence was nominated a number of times for a Daytime Emmy Award for Outstanding Talk Show Host for the eponymous Vicki! (1992–1994), but the show ended after two seasons amid creative battles with her syndicator. In 1997, she hosted Fox After Breakfast, which was renamed The Vicki Lawrence Show, but was cancelled five weeks later due to low ratings.  She was a regular panelist on the 1998 revival of Match Game, but the series only lasted one season.

She tours the country with her "two-woman" show with the first half as herself and the second half done as Mama.  She can also be seen on TV in an infomercial for the Big Boss Grill. She is also known for her voice-over work as Flo on the animated series Hermie and Friends.

In 2018, Lawrence was seen promoting The Carol Burnett Show and other classic television series on the MeTV television network.

Personal life 
Lawrence was married to singer and songwriter Bobby Russell from 1972 to 1974. Lawrence's second husband is Hollywood make-up artist Al Schultz, to whom she has been married since November 16, 1974, and with whom she has two children, Courtney Allison Schultz (born May 3, 1975) and Garrett Lawrence Schultz (born July 3, 1977).

Lawrence and her family appeared on Celebrity Family Feud in July 2015.

Lawrence was diagnosed with chronic idiopathic urticaria (CIU) around 2011. She teamed with the Asthma and Allergy Foundation of America and has become the spokesperson for the campaign CIU & You.

She appeared on The Doctors in 2015 to relay her story and talk about CIU and promote the CIU & You campaign.

She is cousins with actress Ali Axelrad who is known for David Fincher's Mank and Gilmore Girls: A Year in the Life.

Filmography

Discography

Albums

Singles

Books 
Vicki!: The True-Life Adventures of Miss Fireball (1995) – ; published by Simon & Schuster with Marc Eliot, an American biographer listed several times on The New York Times bestsellers list.
Mama for President: Good Lord, Why Not? (2008)  , with Monty Aidem, an American comedy writer.

See also 
 List of 1970s one-hit wonders in the United States

References

External links 
 
 
 
 
 
 

1949 births
Living people
20th-century American actresses
20th-century American comedians
20th-century American singers
20th-century American women singers
21st-century American actresses
21st-century American comedians
21st-century American singers
21st-century American women singers
Actresses from Inglewood, California
Actresses from Los Angeles
American contraltos
American women country singers
American game show hosts
American television talk show hosts
American women pop singers
American sketch comedians
American television actresses
American women comedians
Bell Records artists
Comedians from California
Morningside High School alumni
Primetime Emmy Award winners
Singers from Los Angeles
Traditional pop music singers
The Young Americans members